KOLN (channel 10) is a television station licensed to Lincoln, Nebraska, United States, serving southeastern and central Nebraska as an affiliate of CBS. Owned by Gray Television, the station maintains studios on North 40th Street in Lincoln and transmitter facilities near Beaver Crossing, Nebraska.

KGIN (channel 11) in Grand Island operates as a semi-satellite of KOLN, serving the central portion of the market; this station maintains a news bureau and sales office on West State Street in Grand Island and transmitter facilities near Heartwell, Nebraska. Collectively branded as "10/11", the two stations serve one of the largest coverage areas in the United States, stretching across 42 counties in southern and central Nebraska—almost two-thirds of the state's geographical land area—and an additional four counties in Kansas.

KOLN/KGIN share common ownership with York-licensed NBC affiliate KSNB-TV (channel 4), which was acquired by Gray in 2013 and simulcasts in high definition on the second digital subchannel of KGIN. It previously broadcast MyNetworkTV and MeTV programming, along with central Nebraska-specific newscasts. Following Gray's acquisition of Hastings' NBC affiliate KHAS-TV, the station was shut down and its programming (along with separately-produced newscasts out of Hastings) was moved to KSNB's primary channel, which became the primary NBC affiliate for this vast market. KSNB moved to KHAS' former studio just outside Hastings on US 281, though master control and some internal operations are based at KOLN's facilities. Gray reacquired KNHL (the former KHAS-TV) from Legacy Broadcasting on March 1, 2019, and made it a KSNB satellite to further resolve its signal issues.  KOLN/KGIN is also sister to Lincoln-licensed low-power station KCWH-LD (channel 18), a CW affiliate (through The CW Plus) that served as a translator for KSNB prior to 2018.

KNPL-LD (channel 10) in North Platte operates as another semi-satellite of KOLN. KOLN serves as a master hub for Gray's Nebraska television stations, with the exception of NBC affiliate WOWT (channel 6) in Omaha.

History
KOLN-TV signed on for the first time on February 18, 1953, on channel 12 as Nebraska's third television station and the first outside Omaha. It was owned by Cornhusker Radio and Television Corporation along with KOLN radio (1400 AM; now KLIN). In August 1953, it was purchased by broadcasting pioneer John Fetzer. In February 1954, Fetzer purchased Lincoln's other TV station, KFOR-TV, channel 10, which had launched a few months after KOLN. To avoid running afoul of FCC ownership regulations (and to create a commercial broadcast monopoly for himself in the Lincoln market), Fetzer moved KOLN to channel 10 and donated the channel 12 facilities and the KFOR license to the University of Nebraska for its educational station, KUON-TV. (At sign-on, KOLN was broadcasting at 26.9 kW visual ERP from a  tower next to its studio.)

The station was originally the DuMont Television Network affiliate for the Omaha/Lincoln market. It picked up the ABC affiliation from KFOR-TV after Fetzer shut down that station in March 1954. Meanwhile, Fetzer persuaded the Federal Communications Commission (FCC) to merge Lincoln with the Hastings–Kearney market in central Nebraska. Lincoln has long been the cultural center for central Nebraska, and Fetzer felt that Lincoln had more in common with this area than Omaha. He also wanted an affiliation with a stronger network. Although Fetzer had a very good relationship with CBS, there was little prospect of taking the CBS affiliation from Omaha's KMTV.

Soon after the FCC made Lincoln the center of the new Lincoln–Hastings–Kearney market, KOLN became a primary CBS affiliate. Omaha wouldn't have a primary ABC affiliate again until KETV signed on in 1957. DuMont shut down in 1956, and KOLN dropped the remaining ABC shows from the schedule in 1957. During the late 1950s, the station was also briefly affiliated with the NTA Film Network. Along with its more powerful broadcasting signal, KOLN signed on translator after translator across its vast and mostly rural coverage area over the next few years, cementing a dominance that continues to this day.

KGIN-TV debuted on October 1, 1961, as a satellite of KOLN; since then, the two stations have been known on-air as "10/11." During the 1960s, KOLN/KGIN frequently broadcast games of the Detroit Tigers, which Fetzer had bought in 1956.

Fetzer began selling off his stations in the 1980s. KOLN/KGIN was among the last to be sold, going to Gillett Communications in 1984. Gillett sold the pair to Busse Broadcasting in 1987 to make room for Gillett's acquisition of the Storer Broadcasting stations. Busse merged with current owner Gray Communications, now Gray Television, in 1998.

From KFOR-TV's shutdown in March 1954 until KLKN signed on in 1996, KOLN was the only commercial station in Lincoln, making it one of the largest cities in the country with only one full-power commercial station. The western half of the market had full network service; it was served by KGIN, ABC affiliate KHGI-TV and NBC affiliate KHAS-TV. Later, future sister station KSNB-TV broke off from NTV and joined with Grand Island-based KTVG-TV to become the Fox affiliate for the western half of the market. This resulted in a market that had very little basis in television reality; KOLN/KGIN was the only major-network station shared by the entire market (though KTVG/KSNB added a translator in Lincoln). It was only truly realized when direct-broadcast satellite gained more penetration at the turn of the century.

Despite being the only station in the market, KOLN had no need to air other networks' programming. Most of the Omaha stations provide at least secondary coverage of Lincoln. Until KMTV and WOWT were dropped at the turn of the millennium, most of them were also available on cable.

For a time in January 2009, the KOLN/KGIN website included a section about a Fox affiliate on its second digital subchannel (then used for MyNetworkTV, which was to have moved to a DT3 subcarrier). However, station officials later said there were no immediate plans to launch such a station, describing the page as part of an experimental project not meant for public consumption. At that time, Fox programming was seen on KSNB-TV (now a sister station to KOLN/KGIN) and KTVG-TV (channel 17). Although the station refused to rule out launching a digital Fox station in the future, this was rendered moot when then-CW affiliate KCWL-TV relaunched as Fox affiliate KFXL-TV.

The "10/11" brand is so well established in Nebraska that when Gray brought KSNB back on the air in 2012, it initially did so under the branding "10/11 Central Nebraska." Likewise, when it relaunched its longtime translator in North Platte as locally-focused CBS affiliate KNPL-LD, it used the branding "10/11 North Platte."

Programming

Syndicated programming
Syndicated programs that air on KOLN/KGIN include Jeopardy!, Wheel of Fortune, Live with Kelly and Ryan, Inside Edition and The Kelly Clarkson Show, among others.

News operation
Historically, KOLN/KGIN has garnered some of the highest news ratings in the country. Not only was it the only major-network affiliate shared by the entire market for most of the second half of the 20th century, but it was the only commercial station in Lincoln for 40 years.

Well into the 1980s, when nearly every other local television news broadcast began with the latest news, KOLN began its newscasts with the weather report as a service to its mostly rural audience. A. James Ebel, KOLN's general manager from 1954 to 1985, began this practice not long after he arrived, saying years later, "The first thing I learned when I arrived here in 1954 is that the weather is the No. 1 story in Nebraska." Mel Mains served as KOLN's main news anchor for 34 years, from 1961 to 1995. Chief meteorologist Ken Siemek has been at the station since 1981.

KOLN/KGIN is one of the few television stations in the United States with a husband/wife anchor team, Jon Vanderford and Taryn Vanderford, who serve as anchors for the station's 4 p.m. newscast. They also host, along with morning meteorologist Brad Anderson, Pure Nebraska, a rural lifestyle show airing weekdays at 9 a.m. On September 15, 2007, KOLN/KGIN became the first and only station in the Lincoln–Hastings–Kearney market to broadcast weekend morning newscasts from 7–8 a.m. (The time was later changed to 6:30 a.m.-7:30 a.m. to accommodate Pure Nebraska'''s weekend show on Sundays at 7:30 a.m.)  The weekend morning newscasts were later canceled.

On June 15, 2009, KOLN/KGIN became the first commercial station in Nebraska to broadcast local news in a widescreen format. Then on August 10, 2009, KOLN/KGIN took it one step further to become the first station in Nebraska to launch local news in high definition.  With the change came new graphics and a new website www.1011now.com. On September 13, 2010, KOLN/KGIN debuted the market's first 4 p.m. newscast with 10/11 First at Four.

KOLN/KGIN also produces nightly newscasts, My News at 9, formerly Nebraska Central News & 10/11 Central Nebraska News, targeting all of the viewing area and featuring weather forecasts for both eastern (Lincoln) and central (Grand Island/Hastings/Kearney) Nebraska, which airs at 9 p.m. on KSNB's digital subcarrier and KOLN/KGIN's digital subcarrier. My News at 9 only airs on weekdays at 9 p.m. It is produced and aired in high definition. In June 2014, the MyNetworkTV and MeTV programming was moved to a second subchannel of KSNB, with KSNB's main channel and the KOLN/KGIN subchannels now airing the programming previously seen on KHAS-TV; this includes NBC programming and KHAS-TV's separate Hastings-based news operation, giving Lincoln its first-ever NBC affiliate. With the purchase of KNOP-TV, Gray merged KOLN/KGIN, KSNB and KNOP to form the Nebraska News & Weather Networks. All weather forecasts on the stations are now branded as the Nebraska Weather Network and feature the Nebraska Weather Network logo instead of a station logo in their visual graphics. The three stations can also cover each other's newscasts. Weather on weekends for KSNB is broadcast from their Lincoln studios in a second green screen facility since KOLN is also on air at the same time, and the same is done for KNOP during the weekday evening newscasts. Many news stories are shared between the stations. The result is that essentially for the first time, there is news from the majority of the coverage areas in almost every newscast.

Notable former on-air staff
 Leta Powell Drake – morning show host/portrayed Kalamity Kate for KOLN-TV's Cartoon Corral Vinita Nair – morning show host (early 2000s; later co-host of CBS This Morning: Saturday)

Technical information
The stations' digital signals are multiplexed:

KOLN subchannels

KGIN subchannels

UPN was broadcast on a DT2 subchannel of KOLN and KGIN under the banner UPN Nebraska; the service switched to MyNetworkTV in September 2006 and was locally branded as "MyTV" until being renamed "10–11 Central Nebraska" after the acquisition of KSNB in 2013. It not only airs syndicated programs, MeTV programming, and the entire MyNetworkTV schedule, but also 10/11-produced programming like Pure Nebraska, Star City Buzz and Prepzone Weekly''.

Analog-to-digital conversion
KOLN aired its digital programming on channel 25, while KGIN aired digital programming on channel 32. Both stations shut down their analog signals at midnight on February 16, 2009, the day prior to the original date in which full-power television stations in the United States were set to transition from analog to digital broadcasts under federal mandate (which was later rescheduled for June 12, 2009):
 KOLN shut down its analog signal, over VHF channel 10; the station's digital signal relocated from its pre-transition UHF channel 25 to VHF channel 10.
 KGIN shut down its analog signal, over VHF channel 11; the station's digital signal relocated from its pre-transition UHF channel 32 to VHF channel 11.

KOLN tower collapse
On January 18, 2020, KOLN's transmitter tower near Beaver Crossing collapsed due to an ice storm. No one was injured, and the station was able to restore service via additional towers and cable/satellite delivery. A new tower was completed on the same site in fall 2021, and KOLN resumed normal operations on November 23.

Translators
KOLN/KGIN serves its large coverage area with six translators, all owned by Gray Television. The repeaters broadcast a multiplexed digital signal including high-definition programming.

The repeater in North Platte, KNPL-LD, was formerly a straight translator of KOLN/KGIN. On September 3, 2013, KNPL was re-launched as a semi-satellite of the station, adding local newscasts specific to the North Platte market.

References

External links

Obituary of A. James Ebel (longtime KOLN general manager)
Nebraska Broadcasters Association profile of Mel Mains (longtime KOLN news anchor)
Lincoln Journal-Star's Jeff Korbelik reports on departure of Randy Lube (longtime 10/11 news director)

OLN
CBS network affiliates
NBC network affiliates
Heroes & Icons affiliates
Circle (TV network) affiliates
True Crime Network affiliates
Gray Television
Television channels and stations established in 1953
1953 establishments in Nebraska